St Aubyn may refer to

Places
St Aubyn, Queensland, Australia

Organisations
St Aubyn Centre, a mental health facility in Essex, England
St Aubyns School, a boys' preparatory school in Rottingdean, England
St Aubyn's School, a co-educational preparatory school, in London, England

People
 St Aubyn baronets of Cornwall, England
 Alan St. Aubyn, pen name of British author Frances L. Marshall (1839–1920)
 Amarah-Jae St. Aubyn (born 1994), British actor
 Catherine St Aubyn (1760–1836), English amateur artist
 Edward St Aubyn, English author and journalist
 James Piers St Aubyn (1815–1895), English architect, largely of churches
 John St Aubyn (disambiguation), several people
 Nick St Aubyn (born 1955), British Conservative politician, MP for Guildford
 Thomas St Aubyn (c. 1578 – 1637), English MP for St Ives and then Grampound
 William St. Aubyn (by 1526 – 1558/1571), English MP for Helston, West Looe and Camelford
 St. Aubyn Hines (born 1972), Jamaican Olympic boxer